Gujarat Industrial Development Corporation (GIDC) was established under the Gujarat Industrial Development Act of 1962, with a goal of accelerating industrialization in the state of Gujarat, India.

History
Main role of the GIDC is to identify locations suitable for industrial development and create industrial estates with infrastructure such as roads, drainage, electricity, water supply, street lights, and ready-to-occupy factory sheds. The infrastructure of certain estates has been built for specific industries;  there is an electronics estate at Gandhinagar, ceramics and manufacturing estates in Bhavnagar, chemical estates at Vapi, Ankleshwar, Panoli, Nandesari, Naroda.

Some GIDC estates also have low-cost housing for workers and executives of tenant businesses, and many of the larger estates include amenities and commercial facilities such as banks, shopping complexes, schools, dispensaries, telecommunications centers, police stations, and community halls.

As of February 2008, there are 257 such estates throughout Gujarat, and economies of scale allow the GIDC to offer these plots for substantially less than the cost of creating a similar standalone factory. GIDC has acquired maximum land for the development of Industries in the State of Gujarat, under their possession after Indian Railways.

Famous industrialists like Dhirubhai Ambani of Reliance and Karsanbhai Patel of (Nirma) have their industrial units in GIDC.

Corporation has established 182 industrial estates, ranging from mini to mega sizes, in 25 of the 25 districts of the state. It has also developed 7 Special Economic Zones.

Major SIRs and SEZs

Special Investment Regions
GIDC is now establishing Special Investment Regions, PCPIR, Industrial areas and large /sector-specific estates in tune with the changing economic and industrial scenario.

Notified Areas 
The places that are recognized by the government as Notified Areas are given below:

References

External links
 

Economy of Gujarat
State agencies of Gujarat
State industrial development corporations of India
1962 establishments in Gujarat
Government agencies established in 1962